Kirthal is a large village in Baraut Tehsil, Uttar Pradesh State, India. It lies in the northwest of Bagpat District, near the border with Haryana State. Kirthal's village code is 1038000 and its main post office is in Chhaprauli.

Geography

Villages nearby include Loomb (लूम्ब), Sonti (सोंटी), Ramala (रमाला), Hewa (हेवा), Kakripur (ककडीपुर), Mukandpur (मुकंदपुर), and Soop (सूप).

References 

Villages in Bagpat district